The Emmuraillé Lake is a body of water crossed in its eastern part by the Petit Saguenay River, in the unorganized territory of Sagard, in the Charlevoix-Est Regional County Municipality of the administrative region of Capitale-Nationale, in Quebec, in Canada.

The "Emmuraillé Lake" is indirectly served by the forest road R064 which passes on the west side and bypasses Lac Pilote.

Forestry is the sector's main economic activity; recreotourism activities, second.

The surface of Lac au Sable is usually frozen from the end of November to the beginning of April, however safe circulation on the ice is generally done from mid-December to the end of March.

Geography 
The main watersheds near Emmuraillé lake are:
 north side: Petit Saguenay River;
 east side: Onésime Lake, McLagan Lake, Étienne Brook, Deschênes Lake, Deschênes River, Noire River;
 south side: lac au Bouleau, lac au Sable, Petit Saguenay River;
 west side: Pilote Lake, Pilote Creek.

The Petit Saguenay River successively crosses from south to north lac au Sable, lac au Bouleau and the eastern part of Lac Emmuraillé.

The mouth of Emmuraillé Lake is located at:
  west of Deschênes Lake;
  south of the village center Petit-Saguenay;
  south of the confluence of the Petit Saguenay River and Anse du Petit Saguenay located on the south shore of the Saguenay River.

Toponymy 
The toponym "Lac Emmuraillé" was formalized on December 5, 1968, by the Commission de toponymie du Québec.

See also 
 Charlevoix-Est, a MRC
 Sagard, a TNO
 Petit Saguenay River
 Lac au Sable
 Lac au Bouleau

References 

Lakes of Capitale-Nationale
Charlevoix-Est Regional County Municipality